Ragtag Productions is an American independent film and video production company based in Astoria, Queens. They are noted for the web comedy series We Need Girlfriends that ran in 2006–2007. The company entered into discussions with CBS about turning We Need Girlfriends into a television series pilot with Sex and the City creator Darren Star.

Background
Company founders Steven Tsapelas, Brian Amyot and Angel Acevedo were film majors at Hofstra University in Long Island, New York, where they met. Upon graduation, the three moved to Astoria to work together producing film shorts and submitting them to festivals. After seeing the increasing popularity of online film submissions and contest, they decided to focus on the Internet as a medium to distribute their work.

Filmography
We Need Girlfriends - 2006–2007
I Live With My Parents - 2009
My Future Girlfriend - 2011

References

External links
 Official website
 "We Need Girlfriends" website

Film production companies of the United States